Star Gossage (born 1973) is a New Zealand painter. In addition to painting, her practice includes theatre, film-making, poetry, and sculpture. While referencing European movements such as expressionism, impressionism and surrealism, her work incorporates Māori concepts such as whānau and whakapapa.

Life

Gossage is of Ngati Manuhiri/Wai, Ngati Ruanui, French, English and Portuguese descent and the great-great-granddaughter of Rahui Te Kiri and daughter of the artists Tilly and Peter Gossage. Her Māori heritage is core to her work and following her graduation in 1995 she returned to her ancestral home in Pakiri, north of Auckland, to establish her current home and studio. Her ancestral land is an inspiration for her artwork.

Education 
In 1995, Gossage received a Diploma of Fine Arts from Otago Polytechnic School of Art. During her studies, she experimented with a wide variety of media including film and theatre production (including play-writing) and was inspired by, and worked with, other innovative young Māori art students.

Exhibitions and collections 

Gossage received critical acclaim for her 2014 exhibition Five Maori Painters at Auckland Art Gallery Toi o Tamaki, exhibiting alongside Robyn Kahukiwa, Kura Te Waru Rewiri, Emily Karaka, and Saffronn Te Ratana. With regular exhibitions in New Zealand and throughout the world, her work is held several collections including at Auckland Art Gallery Toi o Tamaki, Te Papa Tongarewa Museum of New Zealand, Ministry of Foreign Affairs and Trade, The Wallace Arts Trust, and University of Auckland. She is 'recognised as one of the most important Māori artists of her generation'. 

A survey exhibition of her work spanning 20 years titled He Tangata The People opened at the New Zealand Portrait Gallery Te Pūkenga Whakaata in 2020 and has been presented at the Sarjeant Gallery Te Whare o Rehua (2021), Pah Homestead (2021/2022), and the Waikato Museum (2022).

Another survey exhibition was held at Pataka Art + Museum in Porirua, Kia tau te Rangimārie – Let Peace be Among Us (24 July – 30 October 2022). Pataka describes her art work: "She paints enigmatic figures in shifting landscapes that explore emotion and memory, journeys of loss and endurance, and relationships with immediate whānau and tūpuna."

Awards and residencies 
In 2014 Gossage won the Arts Foundation's New Generation Award and was nominated for the Singapore Signature Art Prize from Singapore Art Museum. Gossage participated in the Mana Moana residency in Honolulu, Hawaii in 2016, part of a cultural exchange between Hawaii and New Zealand, and supported through the Creative New Zealand International Indigenous Artform Exchange.

References

Further reading 
 Angela Morton Collection, Takapuna Library
 E. H. McCormick Research Library, Auckland Art Gallery Toi o Tāmaki
 Hocken Collections Uare Taoka o Hākena
 Te Aka Matua Research Library, Museum of New Zealand Te Papa Tongarewa

1973 births
Living people
21st-century New Zealand women artists
New Zealand painters
University of Otago alumni
People associated with the Museum of New Zealand Te Papa Tongarewa
New Zealand women painters